Nippawalla Township is a township in Barber County, Kansas, USA.  As of the 2000 census, its population was 26.

Geography
According to the USGS, it contains one cemetery, Liberty.

The streams of Brush Creek and Wilson Slough run through this township.

References
 USGS Geographic Names Information System (GNIS)

External links
 US-Counties.com
 City-Data.com

Townships in Barber County, Kansas
Townships in Kansas